Michael López Martínez (8 February 1997) is a Colombian footballer who plays as a midfielder for Cúcuta Deportivo.

He played for Envigado F.C. from 2016 to 2019. In 2019, he transferred to Cúcuta Deportivo.

References

1997 births
Living people
Colombian footballers
Association football forwards
Envigado F.C. players
Sportspeople from Antioquia Department